Albras Alumínio Brasileiro S.A. is the second-largest aluminium producer in Brazil having a total annual production of around 460,000 tonnes. It is a joint venture between Norsk Hydro (51%) and Nippon Amazon Aluminium Co. Ltd. (NAAC) (49%). The company is supplied with the electric energy it needs (700 MW) from the Tucurui Hydroelectric Plant (4,000 MW).

It is located in the city of Barcarena in Pará.

History
Established on September 1, 1978, Albras was constituted as a joint venture between Brazilian and Japanese capitals. On July 6, 1985, the Albras plant was started for the first time and it was officially inaugurated on October 24 the same year.

References

External links
Home page

Aluminium smelters
Aluminium companies of Brazil